The 32nd General Assembly of Prince Edward Island was in session from March 28, 1894, to June 25, 1897. The Liberal Party led by Frederick Peters formed the government.

In late 1893, after the dissolution of the 31st General Assembly, the Legislative Council was combined with the House of Assembly into a unicameral body known as the Legislative Assembly. An assemblyman and councillor was elected from each electoral district.

There were four sessions of the 32nd General Assembly:

James H. Cummiskey was elected speaker.

Members

Kings

Prince

Queens

References

External links
  Election results for the Prince Edward Island Legislative Assembly, 1893-12-13
 Prince Edward Island, garden province of Canada, WH Crosskill (1904)

Terms of the General Assembly of Prince Edward Island
1894 establishments in Prince Edward Island
1897 disestablishments in Prince Edward Island